No. 1 Croydon (formerly the NLA Tower, and colloquially the 50p Building, the Weddingcake or the Threepenny bit building) is a tall building at 12–16 Addiscombe Road, Croydon, Greater London, next to East Croydon station. It was designed by Richard Seifert & Partners and completed in 1970. 'NLA' stood for 'Noble Lowndes Annuities'. It was one of many new buildings constructed in the growing town of Croydon in the 1960s. The development of tall buildings was later encouraged in the 2004 London Plan, which led to the erection of new skyscrapers as Greater London went through a high-rise boom.

Restoration project 
A refurbishment programme costing over £3.5 million was completed in early 2007. It included a six-month exterior cleaning project, new lobby, landscaping and common areas, and refurbishment of the top ten floors to provide  of high spec, air-conditioned office accommodation.

A substantial amount of work had already been done to improve the façade of the tower. It was identified in a Channel 4 programme as one of the UK's top eyesores. A spokesman for building restoration firm Triton said: "Work is running to schedule and within budget."

Occupiers 
No. 1 Croydon is occupied by a number of companies and organisations, including Atkins, Directline holidays and dotdigital.

In November 2014, a branch of Sainsbury's Local was opened in part of the former courtyard on the north side of the building, effectively forming a part of the structure. The new building attracted criticism on aesthetic grounds and also in respect of safety due to its proximity to the Tramlink track bed.

Other names 
No. 1 Croydon was originally known colloquially as the Threepenny Bit Building, due to its resemblance to a number of threepence coins stacked on top of each other. After the coins stopped being used following decimalisation the building eventually gained the alternative nickname the 50p Building, as it also resembles a stack of the now more familiar 50p pieces; and it is also referred to as The Wedding Cake.  The resemblance to threepenny and 50p coins is approximate, as the building's floors are octagonal (8 sides) whereas threepenny coins were dodecagonal (12 sides) and 50p coins are heptagonal (7 sides).

In popular culture
The building was used as part of an establishing shot in Croydon in the opening credits of the 1980s British sitcom Terry and June. It also appeared in the Black Mirror interactive film, Bandersnatch, as housing the offices of fictional game software developer Tuckersoft.

Listing 
The campaign for listing No.1 Croydon is supported by the Twentieth Century Society but this was turned down by English Heritage in 2013.

See also 
Cherry Orchard Road
East Croydon station

References

External links 
NLA Tower

Buildings and structures completed in 1970
Croydon 2020
Skyscrapers in the London Borough of Croydon